Kigoma Region (Mkoa wa Kigoma in Swahili) is one of Tanzania's 31 administrative regions. The regional capital is the city of Kigoma. Kigoma Region borders Kagera Region, Geita Region, Katavi Region, Tabora Region, DRC and Burundi According to the 2012 national census, the region had a population of 2,127,930, which was higher than the pre-census projection of 1,971,332. For 2002-2012, the region's 2.4 percent average annual population growth rate was tied for the fourteenth highest in the country. It was also the sixteenth most densely populated region with 57 people per square kilometer.

Geography

Kigoma Region resides in the northwestern corner of Tanzania, on the eastern shore of Lake Tanganyika. The region lies at about 5° south and 30° east of Greenwich. The region is bordered to the north by both Burundi and the Kagera Region. To the east, it is bordered by the Geita Region and Tabora Regions, to the south by the Katavi Region, and to the west by Lake Tanganyika, which forms a border with the Democratic Republic of the Congo.

The region's total area is just  less than that of Estonia.

The topography in the north and east is gently rolling hills that gradually become steeper as they get closer to the Albertine Rift margin. The most important river is the Malagarasi, with the Luiche and the Ruchugi being the two other major rivers draining the region.

History

In precolonial Africa the region was a source of ivory and slaves. Tabora and Ujiji were Arab staging areas for shipments to the coast.  It was visited by the early European explorers Richard Burton, John Speke, David Livingstone, and Henry Morton Stanley. In fact, Stanley met Livingstone in Ujiji on the shores of Lake Tanganyika on 27 October 1871. In colonial times, the Kigoma area was known as the Western Region and the capital was Tabora.

Administrative divisions

Districts
Kigoma Region is divided into six districts, each administered by a council except Kigoma and Kasulu which administered with two council each.:

Demographics
Kigoma Region has a total population of 2,127,930.

Ha people are the largest ethnic group living here. Other major populations are those of Wabembe, Wamanyema, Watongwe and Wavinza, Sukuma and Haya. Approximately 150,000 refugees from Burundi and almost another 80,000 refugees from the Democratic Republic of Congo reside in three refugee camps in the Kigoma Region, named Nyarugusu, Mtendeli and Nduta.

References

External links
 

 
Regions of Tanzania